Elizabeth Wellesley, Duchess of Wellington (née Hay; 27 September 1820 – 13 August 1904), VA, was a daughter of the 8th Marquess of Tweeddale. Her husband, Lord Douro, succeeded his father as Duke of Wellington in 1852. She served as Mistress of the Robes to Queen Victoria from 1861 to 1868, and again from 1874 to 1880.

Early life and family
Lady Elizabeth Hay was born a daughter of George Hay, 8th Marquess of Tweeddale. One of her brothers was the ornithologist Viscount Walden, and another the Admiral of the Fleet Lord John Hay.

Marriage
On 18 April 1839 she was married to Lord Douro, eldest son of the famous general and former Tory Prime Minister the first Duke of Wellington. Lord Douro succeeded his father as second Duke of Wellington in 1852. In 1863 she also became Countess of Mornington when her husband inherited the earldom of Mornington on the death of his cousin William Pole-Tylney-Long-Wellesley, 5th Earl of Mornington.

The Duchess of Wellington was appointed Mistress of the Robes to Queen Victoria in 1861 by the Liberal Prime Minister Lord Palmerston, and continued in that role until 1868, serving through the governments of Lord Russell, Lord Derby and Benjamin Disraeli. She was again Mistress of the Robes in Disraeli's second government, 1874 to 1880.

Her husband died on 13 August 1884, and the Dowager Duchess survived him for exactly twenty years to the day, dying at Burhill Park, Walton-on-Thames on 13 August 1904. They had no children, and the marriage, which had been arranged by their respective families, was not a happy one; the historian Norman Gash writes, however, that her father-in-law "found much domestic pleasure" in Elizabeth's company.

The Duchess of Wellington was a Third Class recipient of the Royal Order of Victoria and Albert during Queen Victoria's reign.

References 

Works cited

 
 

1820 births
1904 deaths
Elizabeth Wellesley, Duchess of Wellington
British duchesses by marriage
Ladies of the Royal Order of Victoria and Albert
Mistresses of the Robes to Queen Victoria
Daughters of British marquesses
Wives of knights